Yadkin Creek is a stream in Crawford County in the U.S. state of Missouri.

The name may be a transfer from the Yadkin River in North Carolina.

See also
List of rivers of Missouri

References

Rivers of Crawford County, Missouri
Rivers of Missouri